Domibacillus enclensis is a Gram-positive, strictly aerobic and motile bacterium from the genus of Domibacillus which has been isolated from marine sediments from the Chorão Island in India.

References

External links 

Type strain of Domibacillus enclensis at BacDive -  the Bacterial Diversity Metadatabase

Bacillaceae
Bacteria described in 2014